Samuel Thatcher (July 1, 1776 – July 18, 1872) was a member of the United States House of Representatives from Massachusetts.

He was born in Cambridge in the Province of Massachusetts Bay on July 1, 1776; was graduated from Harvard University in 1793; studied law; was admitted to the bar in 1797 and commenced practice in New Gloucester (then in Massachusetts' District of Maine); moved to Warren in 1800; member of the Massachusetts house of representatives 1801–1811; was elected as a Federalist to the Seventh Congress to fill the vacancy caused by the resignation of Silas Lee; reelected to the Eighth Congress and served from December 6, 1802, to March 3, 1805; sheriff of Lincoln County, 1814–1821; member of the Maine house of representatives in 1824; moved to Bangor, Maine, in 1860, and died there July 18, 1872; interment in Bangor's Mount Hope Cemetery.

External links
 
 

1776 births
1872 deaths
Harvard College alumni
Members of the Maine House of Representatives
Members of the Massachusetts House of Representatives
Members of the United States House of Representatives from the District of Maine
Politicians from Bangor, Maine
People from Lincoln County, Maine
Burials at Mount Hope Cemetery (Bangor, Maine)
Maine sheriffs
Federalist Party members of the United States House of Representatives from Massachusetts
People from Warren, Maine
People from Cumberland County, Maine
People of colonial Massachusetts
People from Cambridge, Massachusetts